The Jingzhou Bridge  is a large bridge complex crossing the Yangtze River just south of the city-center of Jingzhou, Hubei. The bridge carries four lanes of the G55 Erenhot–Guangzhou Expressway.

See also
Yangtze River bridges and tunnels
List of largest cable-stayed bridges

Bridges in Hubei
Bridges over the Yangtze River
Cable-stayed bridges in China
Bridges completed in 2002
2002 establishments in China